Briertone is a band from the Central Coast of California. They combine indie, Southern rock and bluegrass elements to create a musical style that they refer to as "outlaw rock."

The first three of their 4 EP's have been released on independent label Something Sacred Recordings.  Their 4th and most recent EP, "Sky's Torn Open" was released independently on October 14, 2011.

Band members
Adam Pasion - vocals, guitar, mandolin, fiddle
Matt Black - guitar, vocals
Elijah Merritt - banjo, keys, guitar, mandolin, vocals
Bobby Lucy - drums, vocals
Robbie English - bass

Former members
Taylor Odenwald - bass, guitar, banjo
Lane Biermann - drums
Roger Tompkins - bass
Gabe Munoz - bass
Chris Nielsen - guitar, vocals, mandolin.
Caleb Ralph - bass, vocals
Kurtis Heck - guitar
Mike Newsom - bass
Aaron Wick - drums
Addison Francisco - guitar, vocals
Cory O'Keefe - drums
Brandon Gatlin - keys, pedal steel
Andrew Redel - bass
Emily Wilson - vocals, keys

Discography
Tumbleweed EP (2003)
Confessions Of The Wicked EP(2004)
Sojourners EP (2006)
Sky's Torn Open EP (2011)

External links
Official Site
Facebook
Bandcamp
Twitter
Myspace
PureVolume
Something Sacred Collective

Musical groups from California